Bolukan (also Romanized as Bolūkān; also known as Boledgān) is a village in Barvanan-e Sharqi Rural District, Torkamanchay District, Meyaneh County, East Azerbaijan Province, Iran. At the 2006 census, its population was 537, in 117 families.

References 

Populated places in Meyaneh County